Laurent's plated lizard (Gerrhosaurus bulsi) is a species of lizard in the Gerrhosauridae family.
It is found in Angola, Democratic Republic of the Congo, and Zambia.

References

Gerrhosaurus
Reptiles described in 1954
Taxa named by Raymond Laurent